The Women's 400 Freestyle at the 11th FINA World Aquatics Championships was swum on 24 July 2005 in Montreal, Quebec, Canada. Preliminary heats were swum that morning, with the top-8 finishers advancing to swim the race again in that evenings Final.

As the competition was held in a long course (50m) pool, the race consisted of 8 lengths of freestyle.

At the start of the event, the existing World (WR) and Championships (CR) records were:
WR: 4:03.85, Janet Evans (USA), swum 22 September 1988 in Seoul, South Korea;
CR: 4:06.28, Tracey Wickham (Australia), swum 24 August 1978 in Berlin, Germany.

Results

Prelims

Final

References
Worlds 2005 results: Women's 800m Freestyle Prelims, from OmegaTiming.com (official timer of the 2005 Worlds); Retrieved 2010-02-10.
Worlds 2005 results: Women's 800m Freestyle Finals, from OmegaTiming.com (official timer of the 2005 Worlds); Retrieved 2010-02-10.

Swimming at the 2005 World Aquatics Championships
2005 in women's swimming